Naval Research Logistics is a peer-reviewed scientific journal that publishes papers in the field of logistics, especially those in the areas of  operations research, applied statistics, and quantitative modeling. It was established in 1954 and is published by John Wiley & Sons. Its current editor is Ming Hu.

External links 
 

Statistics journals
Computational statistics journals
Mathematics journals
Publications established in 1954
English-language journals